Alpena CW is a CW-affiliated cable-only channel for the Alpena, Michigan market, carrying The CW Plus with no local deviation outside advertising. For the purposes of identification in electronic program guides and Nielsen ratings tabulation, it additionally identifies under the fictional callsign of WBAE. Alpena CW is operated by Spectrum (the area's cable provider), and is carried on channel 5 in standard definition only. The channel is based out of the company's offices on M-32 in the city.

Outside of WBKB-TV (channel 11), which has four channels providing CBS, NBC, ABC and Fox/MyNetworkTV subchannels, Alpena CW is the only other commercial station (albeit on cable) operating in the Alpena market.

Before becoming a CW Plus affiliate, the station was a WB affiliate via The WB 100+ and was branded as "Alpena's WB 21". The WB 100+ was a similar cable-only operation as the current CW Plus service. It seamlessly became associated with the new CW Plus network on September 18, 2006 after the merger of the WB and UPN into that one network.

External links
The CW
 Facebook -- Alpena CW 21

Television channels and stations established in 1998
The CW affiliates
Television stations in Alpena, Michigan